John Hibbs is a New Zealand former professional rugby league footballer who played in the 1960s and 1970s, he represented New Zealand in the 1975 World Cup.

Playing career
Hibbs played in Greymouth, representing both the West Coast and the South Island. He was first selected for the New Zealand national rugby league team in 1969, playing against Australia. In 1974 he won the New Zealand Rugby League player of the year award.

His last match for New Zealand was against France in 1975 at the World Championship.

References

Living people
New Zealand rugby league players
New Zealand national rugby league team players
West Coast rugby league team players
South Island rugby league team players
Rugby league second-rows
Year of birth missing (living people)